The 2011–12 season was Oldham Athletic's 15th consecutive season in the third tier of the English football league system. The team was managed by Paul Dickov and captained by Dean Furman following the departure of the previous captain, Reuben Hazell after the 2010–11 season.

As well as Hazell's departure, a number of other players, including goalkeeper Dean Brill, former youth team players Lewis Alessandra and Deane Smalley and highly rated midfielder Dale Stephens left the Latics before the start of the season. In their place, Dickov signed goalkeeper Alex Cisak from Accrington Stanley and Zander Diamond from Aberdeen. Jean-Yves Mvoto, who had been on loan at Oldham during the 2010–11 season was also signed on a permanent contract. Dickov made his highest profile signing of the summer on transfer deadline day, 31 August 2011, when he signed Finnish forward Shefki Kuqi following his release by Newcastle United. Kuqi became an immediate success, scoring 11 goals in his first 15 games for Oldham.

The Latics struggled with inconsistency in the league for the first half of the season, ending 2011 in 14th place in League One. However, propelled by Kuqi's goals and the form of loan signings Luca Scapuzzi and Robbie Simpson, Oldham progressed to the Northern Section Final of the Football League Trophy and the third round of the FA Cup, eventually losing over two legs to Chesterfield in the Football League Trophy and going down 5–1 to Premier League Liverpool in the FA Cup after a creditable display at Anfield.

The end of Oldham's cup runs coincided with a loss of form in the league and the end of Kuqi's goalscoring run. After starting 2012 eight points from the play-offs in 14th place, the Latics slipped into a relegation battle, winning only 5 of their next 20 matches before their League One status was guaranteed by a 1–1 draw at home with Preston North End. The season ended with a 2–1 victory at home to Carlisle, following which Oldham prepared for a summer of change, with a total of 18 first-team players out of contract for the 2012–13 season.

League table

Squad statistics

First-team squad
Includes all players who were awarded squad numbers during the season.

 (Captain)

 
 

 (Player/Coach)

Appearances, goals & disciplinary record

Top scorers

Transfers

Results & fixtures

Pre-season friendlies

League One

FA Cup

League Cup

Football League Trophy

References 

Oldham Athletic A.F.C. seasons
Oldham Athletic